The discography of Chris Cagle, an American country music singer, consists of five studio albums and three compilation albums. Additionally, he has released sixteen singles to country radio. Nine of those singles have been in the top twenty positions on the U.S. Billboard Hot Country Songs chart: "My Love Goes On and On", "Laredo", "What a Beautiful Day", "Chicks Dig It", "Miss Me Baby", "What Kinda Gone", "Got My Country On", "Let There Be Cowgirls" and "I Breathe In, I Breathe Out", which reached Number One in 2001.

Albums

Studio albums

Compilation albums

Singles

Music videos

Notes

References

Country music discographies
Discographies of American artists